Achyropappus is a genus of flowering plants in the daisy family described as a genus in 1820.

Only one species is currently accepted, though several other names have been coined in the genus. Achyropappus anthemoides is native to central Mexico (Tlaxcala, México State, Hidalgo, etc.).>

References

Monotypic Asteraceae genera
Endemic flora of Mexico
Bahieae